Naphat Thamrongsupakorn (born 16 November 1987), is a Thai professional footballer who plays as a striker for Thai League 3 club Samutsongkhram.

International career

In March 2012, Napat debut for Thailand in a friendly match against Bhutan.

International

International goals

References

External links
 Profile at Goal

1987 births
Living people
Naphat Thamrongsupakorn
Naphat Thamrongsupakorn
Association football forwards
Naphat Thamrongsupakorn
Naphat Thamrongsupakorn
Naphat Thamrongsupakorn
Naphat Thamrongsupakorn
Naphat Thamrongsupakorn
Naphat Thamrongsupakorn
Naphat Thamrongsupakorn